Frank Taylor (1 March 1890 – 25 June 1960) was a New Zealand cricketer. He played seven first-class matches for Auckland between 1909 and 1914.

See also
 List of Auckland representative cricketers

References

External links
 

1890 births
1960 deaths
New Zealand cricketers
Auckland cricketers
Cricketers from Auckland